Epoka e Re (English: The New Epoch) is a Kosovar daily newspaper published in the Albanian language in Kosovo's capital Pristina since 1999.  

The founder and managing editor of Epoka e Re is Muhamet Mavraj, activist and former leader of the students of the University of Pristina during the student protests of 1997.

Epoka e Re is known for its critical journalistic framework, which target is reaching a new information environment in shaping the Albanian and critical audience.

See also
 Media of Kosovo
List of newspapers in Kosovo

References

External links
 Epoka e Re, Pristina, 2000-2015

Newspapers published in Kosovo
Mass media in Pristina